Mairiporã is a Brazilian municipality in São Paulo state. It is part of the São Paulo metropolitan area. The population is 101,937 (2020 est.) in an area of 321 km².

History

It became a municipality in 1889, separating from Guarulhos, it was named "Juqueri", and it comprised also what today are the cities of Franco da Rocha, Caieiras and Francisco Morato. The current name was adopted in December 1948, and means "beautiful city" (mairy: village, city + poranga: beautiful).

Geography

Mairiporã is situated at an average altitude of 790m. The highest points of Mairiporã are in Serra da Cantareira, where it reaches an altitude of over 1100m in some areas.

Climate: Like in all of the São Paulo metropolitan area, the climate is subtropical. Summer is considerably warm and rainy while the winter is mild. The average annual temperature is about 18 °C. The coldest month is July with an average 14 °C and the warmest February with an average 22 °C. The annual pluviometric index is about 1400mm.

Roads

BR-381 Rodovia Fernão Dias.

Road connecting São Paulo Capital City to Belo Horizonte in the state of Minas Gerais. BR-381 crosses Mairiporã from south to north, from Parque suíço in the south to Terra Preta in the north.

SP-023 Rodovia Prefeito Luiz Salomão Chamma.

Connects SP-332 Rodovia Tancredo de Almeida Neves in Franco da Rocha to BR-381 Rodovia Fernão Dias.

Demographics

Data from 2000 Census

Total population - 60.111
Urban Population - 48,077
Rural Population - 12,034
Men - 30,214
Women - 29,897

Population density: 186.97 people per km2

Infant mortality: 18.60 per thousand

Life expectancy: 69.82 years

Total fertility rate: 2.22 per woman

Literacy rate: 90.7%

Human Development Index: 0.803
Standard of living: 0.784
Life Expectancy: 0.747
Education: 0.877

(Source: IPEADATA)

Tourism

The municipality contains part of the  Cantareira State Park, created in 1962, which protects a large part of the metropolitan São Paulo water supply.
Mairiporã is a city in Serra da Cantareira north of São Paulo City. It is in a great location for tourists who are searching for connection with nature and tranquility yet close to the capital.
The city is rich in many radical sports, like Paraglider in Pico do Olho D'água, downhill in Trilha da Saracura, the Trilha dos Macacos with waterfalls among others.

Gallery

References

Municipalities in São Paulo (state)